Die Rosenheim-Cops is a German television series set in Chiemgau, mainly in Rosenheim. It is produced by the Bavaria Film GmbH for the ZDF public TV network.

The cost per episode is estimated at 425,000 euros.

Concept 
The series' main overall focus lies on the contrasting personalities of a rustic Upper Bavarian small town inspector and his frequently replaced city slicker colleague, who has usually been transferred to the town for mostly incomprehensible reasons. Despite all differences, the new colleague is always warmly received and quickly integrated into the team.

The small town inspector Korbinian Hofer was played by Joseph Hannesschläger, who died in January 2020.

Each episode usually starts with the discovery of a body. This is communicated to the investigators by the secretary Mrs. Stockl with the words "Es gabat a Leich!" (Bavarian dialect for "There is a dead body").

Due to the show's lighthearted nature, it is customary for episodes to feature a comedic side plot, which runs parallel to the central storyline and is usually resolved right after the main plot's conclusion. These side stories are almost always in no way connected to the murder investigation the main story commonly consists of and may feature any kind of potentially humorous scenario, from an unexpected lottery win to more general events like comedic occurrences at the police office or on a farm. This kind of general writing scheme is exceedingly characteristic for early-evening crime shows on German public television.

Participating actors and actresses include: Marlene Morreis.

See also
List of German television series

References

External links
 

German crime television series
2000s German police procedural television series
2010s German police procedural television series
2020s German police procedural television series
Television shows set in Bavaria
2002 German television series debuts
2010s German television series
German-language television shows
ZDF original programming